Radišič or Radisich may refer to:

 Jaye Radisich (1976–2012), Australian politician
 Nika Radišič (born 2000), Slovenian tennis player
 Paul Radisich (born 1962), New Zealand racing driver
 Tatjana Radisic (born 1973), Serbian costume designer
 Živko Radišić (born 1937), Bosnian politician